Codex Ríos is an Italian translation and augmentation of a Spanish colonial-era manuscript, Codex Telleriano-Remensis, that is partially attributed to Pedro de los Ríos, a Dominican friar working in Oaxaca and Puebla between 1547 and 1562.  The codex itself was likely written and drawn in Italy after 1566.

Description 
The manuscript is focused on the Tolteca-Chichimeca culture in the Tehuacan Valley in modern-day Puebla and Oaxaca.  It can be divided into seven sections: 

 Cosmological and mythological traditions with emphasis on the four epochs.
 An almanac, or tonalamatl, for the 260-day divinatory year common in Mesoamerica.
 Calendar tables for the years 1558 through 1619, without drawings.
 An 18-month festival calendar, with drawings of the gods of each period.
 Ritual customs, with portraits of Indians. 
 Pictorial chronicles for the years 1195-1549 beginning with the migration from Chicomoztoc and covering later events in the Valley of Mexico.
 Glyphs for the years 1556 through 1562, without drawings or text. 

Codex Ríos consists of 101 pages of European paper, accordion-folded.  It is held in the Vatican Library, Rome, and is also variously known as Codex Vatican A, Codex Vaticanus A, and Codex Vaticanus 3738.

Facsimile: Codex Vaticanus A (3738), Rome, Bibliotheca Apostolica Vaticana, around 1580; Akademische Druck- u. Verlagsanstalt (ADEVA) Graz 1979. Colour reproduction for studies of the manuscript in possession of the Bibliotèca Apostolica Vaticana, reduced to 7/10 of the original size, i.e. to 340 x 260 mm. Miniature paintings with Italian notes. Half leather binding. Introduction: Akademische Druck- u. Verlagsanstalt. 14 pp. and 192 plates. CODICES SELECTI, Vol. LXV

It is the only colonial Mexican manuscript fully annotated in Italian, and the only ancient Mexican manuscript establishing thirteen celestial layers in the Aztec cosmos and nine levels of the underworld.

Gallery

See also
Codex Vaticanus B
Mesoamerican codices
Aztec codices
Aztec calendar

References 

Astrological texts
Rios, Codex
Manuscripts of the Vatican Library